An autotransfusionist, also known as a perioperative blood management technologist,  is a specialized allied health professional who operates the cell saver machine during surgeries that expect significant blood loss.

The autotransfusionist is responsible for collecting shed blood from the patient during the operation, scrubs or cleans the blood of impurities, then makes it available to be reinfused into the patient. The process is commonly known as "cell-saver" and is considered far superior to the use of blood from a donor, because it reduces the possibility of infection and provides more functional cells back to the patient. Because the blood is recirculated, there is no limit to the amount of blood that can be given back to the patient.

Autotransfusion can be achieved in the operating room, intensive care unit, and emergency department and require varying degrees of expertise depending on the procedure.

Procedures 
Autotransfusionists are involved in many types of surgical procedures, including:
 Abdominal aortic aneurysm
 Liver transplantation/Liver resection
 Jehovah Witness with patient approval and expected large blood loss.
 Patient with antibodies for whom cross-matched blood is unavailable
 Pediatric spines
 Craniotomy
 Prostatectomy
 Spinal fusion
 Hip Revision
 Kidney, pancreas, and small bowel transplants
 Hip replacement
 Knee replacement
 Hysterectomy
 Myomectomy
 Endovascular aneurysm repair
 Thoracic aortic aneurysm
 ENT

Education 

Most autotransfusionists hold a bachelor's degree and have some form of credentialed medical background ranging from:
 Anesthesia (Cer.A.T., or Cer.A.T.T.)
 Medical Technology (MLT, or MT)
 Nursing (LPN or RN)
 Perfusion (CCP)
 Respiratory Therapy (CRT or RRT)
 Surgery (CST)

Currently, the International Board of Blood Management is the governing body for certification in autotransfusion (CPBMT). The IBBM's mission is to promote education and sound scientific principles to advance the safe and competent practice of perioperative blood management.

In order to become a Certified Perioperative Blood Management Technologist (CPBMT), one must:
 Have a minimum of a high school diploma or equivalent
 Be practicing in the field of blood management for a minimum of one year
 Complete a yearly minimum of fifty autotransfusion procedures.

References

External links
 American Association of Blood Banks
 American Board of Cardiovascular Perfusion
 American Society of Anesthesia Technologists & Technicians
 American Society of ExtraCorporeal Technology
 International Board of Blood Management
 Australian and New Zealand College of Perfusionists

Allied health professions
Transfusion medicine